Thorleif Larsen (7 December 1916 – 21 June 1975) was a Norwegian footballer. He played in two matches for the Norway national football team in 1945.

References

External links
 

1916 births
1975 deaths
Norwegian footballers
Norway international footballers
Place of birth missing
Association footballers not categorized by position